(born May 15, 1935), better known by his stage name , is a Japanese singer, actor, director, composer, author and drag queen.

Career
Miwa began his career aged 17 as a professional cabaret singer in the Ginza district in Chūō, Tokyo, after having moved to the city in 1952. He began working in various nightclubs singing his favourites from the French chansons, such as those of Édith Piaf, Yvette Guilbert and Marie Dubas.

Miwa became well known in 1957 after his smash-hit "Me Que Me Que", which included a string of profanities not used in media at the time. He also became renowned for his effeminate beauty, making him a hit with the media, and performed a monthly show at Shibuya Jean-Jean called  ("The World of Akihiro Miwa") from the 1970s until its closure in 2000, as well as touring Japan.

Social activism
As well as his entertainment career, Miwa has also written many books, and is known for his outspoken and often highly critical comments on social issues, the government and war, having been in Nagasaki at the time of its bombing in 1945, but having escaped relatively unhurt.

Miwa was against Japan's 2015 Japanese military legislation and Prime Minister Abe's regime, stating that "Prime Minister Abe and those who voted for the LDP should go to the front as Japanese soldiers firstly." Miwa is also critical of Japanese militarism in World War II due to the experiences of his childhood.

In 1964, Miwa first released  ("The Song of the ) after giving a show at a small mining town, due to a mistake by a producer. While he was not entirely willing to perform at first, he was touched at the sight of workers who had come to see him, having bought their tickets with the little wages miners received then. Miwa was "ashamed and embarrassed of [himself], standing before them in [his] flamboyant clothes", and also that he did not have a song "for them".

This experience inspired him to write , as well as his rule to not crossdress or wear any of his usual extravagant clothing or make-up when he sang this song, wearing instead the shabby, dark clothes of a post-World War II child and dyeing his literally yellow hair to a more natural black. The song was eventually banned from commercial broadcasting, leading to an outcry among viewers and Miwa himself, stating that it was being judged by one word from the title, and not the content.

After numerous covers were made of the song by artists such as Kyu Sakamoto and Kuwata Keisuke,  was broadcast nationwide in the 2012 63rd NHK Kōhaku Uta Gassen. Miwa appeared in his old, plain showboy-like costume, singing in the dark with only faint pinspot light for the audience to barely distinguish his face, as his request.

Television and film
Although Miwa is better known as a cabaret singer, he has also appeared in a number of films, beginning as a laundry boy in the film  in 1961 under his real name. He also appeared in Shuji Terayama's  in 1967. In 1968 he starred in and composed the theme song for Kinji Fukasaku's Black Lizard, based on Yukio Mishima's stage adaptation of the Edogawa Rampo novel; Mishima also had a cameo in the film as an embalmed corpse. The next year he made another film with Fukasaku, Black Rose Mansion.

In recent years he has voiced characters in Hayao Miyazaki's internationally successful anime films Princess Mononoke and Howl's Moving Castle, and appeared in Takeshi Kitano's 2005 film Takeshis'. In March 2007, he performed the role of Empress Sisi in the play  by writer Jean Cocteau at Parco Theatre in Shibuya. In 2009, Miwa voiced the Pokémon Arceus in the film Pokémon: Arceus and the Jewel of Life.

From 2005 to 2010, he co-hosted the successful weekly television program  (The spring of aura) alongside spiritual counsellor Hiroyuki Ehara and Tokio member Taichi Kokubun. While the show initially aired as late-night program, its popularity bumped it up to a primetime slot in 2007.

References

External links
Official website

1935 births
Living people
People from Nagasaki
Hibakusha
Gay singers
Japanese LGBT singers
Japanese gay musicians
Japanese gay actors
Japanese drag queens
Japanese male voice actors
Japanese television personalities
Japanese male film actors
Musicians from Nagasaki Prefecture
Actors from Nagasaki Prefecture
Male voice actors from Nagasaki Prefecture